Pathapatnam is a town in Srikakulam district of the Indian state of Andhra Pradesh. It is located in Pathapatnam mandal of Palakonda revenue division. Pathapatnam is located on the border of Srikakulam district of Andhra Pradesh and Gajapati district of Odisha. Parlakhemundi, the headquarters of Gajapati District, can be considered as twin town of Pathapatnam because of its close proximity. It is located around 65 km from srikakulam. It was the old capital of Paralakhemundi Gajapati Maharajah of his erstwhile kingdom . Hence it was named as Puruna Patana Odia that Means Patha Patnam in Telugu.

Geography
Pathapatnam is located at .It has an average elevation of 82 meters (272 feet). It is located on the banks of Mahendratanaya River which is a tributary of Vamsadhara River

Demographics
Pathapatnam is a town located in Pathapatnam mandal of Srikakulam district, Andhra Pradesh with total 3797 families residing. The Pathapatnam village has population of 15954 of which 7919 are males while 8035 are females as per Population Census 2011.

In Pathapatnam village population of children with age 0-6 is 1468 which makes up 9.20% of total population of village. Average Sex Ratio of Pathapatnam village is 1015 which is higher than Andhra Pradesh state average of 993. Child Sex Ratio for the Pathapatnam as per census is 955, higher than Andhra Pradesh average of 939.

Pathapatnam village has higher literacy rate compared to Andhra Pradesh. In 2011, literacy rate of Pathapatnam village was 78.57% compared to 67.02% of Andhra Pradesh. In Pathapatnam Male literacy stands at 85.24% while female literacy rate was 72.04%.

As per constitution of India and Panchyati Raaj Act, Pathapatnam village is administrated by Sarpanch (Head of Village) who is elected representative of village.

Transport
National Highway 326A (India)  Connects Pathapatnam town. State Highways 96 and 93 are connected to pathapatnam town from Tekkali and meliyaputti mandals.

Pathapatnam town is well connect to Tekkali and Meliyaputti mandals.

Pathapatnam can be reached by train via the Naupada-Gunupur branch line. The railway station is Pathapatnam (PHM) station of East Coast Railway Zone. It is connected to Howrah-Chennai main line. There are plenty of buses say every 15 minutes from district headquarters srikakulam

It's easy to reach Pathapatnam  by State transport corporation busses.

Pathapatnam is Connected by APSRTC busses , from Palasa, Tekkali and from Srikakulam bus stations. More than 70 ordinary bus services runs by APSRTC , to this town from Palasa , Tekkali , Srikakulam , Hiramandalam.

APSRTC running Express busses services from anakapalli to Parlakimidi , by connecting Pathapatnam.

Assembly constituency
Pathapatnam is an assembly constituency in Andhra Pradesh. There are 1,27,757 registered voters in this constituency in 1999 elections.
It consists of 5 mandals. 
Pathapatnam
Hiramandalam
Meliaputti
Lakshminarasupeta
Kothuru

List of Elected Members:

1951 - Mandangi Pentananaidu
1967 - P. Gunnayya
1983 - Tota Tulasida Naidu
1985 - Dharmana Narayana Rao
1996 - Lakshmi parvathi
1978, 1989, 1994, 1999 and 2004 - Kalamata Mohana Rao
2009 - Satrucharla Vijaya Rama Raju
for the first time an educationist got nearly 1200 votes as a representative of a professional and high ideological party, loksatta.

References

Cities and towns in Srikakulam district
Mandal headquarters in Srikakulam district